The 2003 Liga Indonesia Premier Division (also known as the Liga Bank Mandiri for sponsorship reasons) was the ninth season of the Liga Indonesia Premier Division, the top Indonesian professional league for association football clubs, since its formation in 1994. It began on 12 January and ended on 15 September. Petrokimia Putra were the defending champions.

Teams

Team changes

Relegated from Premier Division 

 Persebaya
 Persedikab
 Persema
 Persikab
 PSBL
 PSMS

Promoted to Premier Division 

 Persik
 Perseden

Stadiums and locations

League standings
</onlyinclude>

Relegation play-offs
Perseden and Persib compete with Persela and PSIM in a round-robin play-off to secure two spots in next season's Premier Division. The matches were held in Solo.
</onlyinclude>

Awards

Top scorers
This is a list of the top scorers from the 2003 season.

Best player
 Musikan (Persik).

References

External links
Indonesia - List of final tables (RSSSF)

Top level Indonesian football league seasons
Indonesian Premier Division seasons
1
1
Indonesia
Indonesia